The All-Japan Interprefectural Ekiden Championships are two annual ekiden (road running relay) competitions between the 47 Prefectures of Japan. The championships are both held in January and are divided by gender. The Empress Cup - Interprefectural Women's Ekiden is held in Kyoto on the third Sunday in January. The Interprefectural Men's Ekiden is held in Hiroshima in recent years on the fourth Sunday of January.

Women's Championship
The Empress Cup - Interprefectural Women's Ekiden Championship is held in Kyoto on the third Sunday in January.  The 2012 running marks the 30th annual event. Forty seven teams from the 47 prefectures of Japan compete. The course is the same as the course for the high school boys national ekiden race held on the third Sunday of December, except that the women's relay has 9 stages (rather than 7) over the 42.195 kilometers. The stages are 6k  4k  3k  4k  4.0175k  4.0875k  4k  3k and 10k. The two 3k stages are reserved for junior high athletes and generally high school athletes run the 5 stages that are 4k or just over 4k. Collegiate and open runners take the 6k and 10k stages.  The mixed-age squads maintain a rapid pace. In 2009 the first 10 team teams finished under 2 hours and 20 minutes, and 12 teams broke 2:20 in 2012. In 2009, the team from Kyoto took its 13th championship, and as of that year, in the ekiden's 20 years Kyoto has only twice placed outside the top 6. Okayama took its first ever title in 2010, Kyoto reclaimed it in 2011, and in 2012 Kyoto finished second, a minute back from the winning team from neighboring Osaka.

Note: Jr.HS = Junior High School, H.S.= High School

Men's Championship

In the men's All-Japan Interprefectural Ekiden Championship, 7 runners run 48 kilometers in stages of 7k  3k  8.5k  5k  8.5k  3k  and 13k.  In both races, each team is composed of runners selected to represent one prefecture, a total of 47 teams in each race. The majority of the team members are high school and junior high school elite runners.  Junior high runners are assigned to the two 3k stages and high school runners are assigned to the 7k, the 5k and 8.5k stages. Open runners are placed in the remaining 8.5k stage and the 13k stage. Despite the youth, the first 7 men's teams in 2009 finished under 2 hours and 21 minutes (48k), the equivalent of 14:40 5k pace or 8:48 3k pace. In 2009 the team from Nagano took its 5th title in 6 years.

Note: Jr HS = Junior High School, HS= High School

References

External links
Official website for Women's Championship
Official website for Men's Championship
Women's results and discussion
 2009
 2010
 2011
 2012
Men's results and discussion
2009
2010
 2011

Ekiden
Road running competitions in Japan